Harrison James Minturn (born 26 December 2003) is an English professional footballer who plays as a defender for Chippenham Town on loan from League Two club Swindon Town.

Career
Minturn started his career with Swindon Town, making his first-team debut in November 2021 during an EFL Trophy group-stage tie against Newport County, playing the full 90 minutes in the 1–0 victory.

In early 2022, Minturn joined Chippenham Town on loan but was recalled in March. Later that month Minturn signed his first professional contract with Swindon. In September 2022, Minturn joined National League North club Gloucester City on a one-month loan deal. Following the end of this loan spell, Minturn returned for a second loan spell at Chippenham Town. In December 2022, Minturn returned to Swindon and was on the bench for their 1-0 league win at Barrow.  He made his league debut for Swindon as a substitute in a 3-3 draw with Gillingham in January 2023.

Career statistics

References

External links

2003 births
Living people
English footballers
Association football midfielders
Swindon Town F.C. players
Chippenham Town F.C. players
Gloucester City A.F.C. players
English Football League players
National League (English football) players